Ivan Cerović (born 1 March 1982) is a former professional tennis player from Croatia.

Biography
Born in Slovenia, Cerovic is from the Croatian city of Rijeka. As a junior, he made it to number 31 in the world and reached the quarter-finals of the boys' singles at the 2000 US Open.

He competed in his first ATP Tour tournament in Umag, the 2001 Croatia Open, appearing in the doubles with Marko Tkalec, for an opening round exit.

Mostly he played on the Challenger circuit and won a title in 2005, the doubles at the Samarkand Challenger.

In 2006, he featured in a Davis Cup tie for Croatia, an away fixture against Austria in Graz. The Croatians secured the tie after the doubles so Cerovic was given an opportunity in the first of the reverse singles. He lost the match to Alexander Peya in three sets.

He won a bronze medal in the mixed doubles event at the 2007 Summer Universiade in Bangkok. His partner was Serbian player Ivana Abramović.

In 2008, he returned to Umag and played the Croatian Open for a second time. He again competed in the doubles, this time with Ivan Dodig. The pair made it to the quarter-finals.

Challenger titles

Doubles: (1)

See also
List of Croatia Davis Cup team representatives

References

External links
 
 
 

1982 births
Living people
Croatian male tennis players
Universiade medalists in tennis
Slovenian emigrants to Croatia
People from Trbovlje
Universiade bronze medalists for Croatia
Medalists at the 2007 Summer Universiade